The Women's ski cross competition at the FIS Freestyle Ski and Snowboarding World Championships 2023 was held on 24 and 26 February 2023.

Qualification
The qualification was held on 24 February.

Elimination round

Quarterfinals

Heat 1

Heat 3

Heat 2

Heat 4

Semifinals

Heat 1

Heat 2

Finals

Small final

Big final

References

Women's ski cross